BR-459 is a federal highway that connects Poços de Caldas, in Minas Gerais, to Lorena, in the state of São Paulo. Its extension is planned to the municipality of Angra dos Reis, in the state of Rio de Janeiro.

Route description
In this state, the highway is part of the Caminhos Gerais, Serras Verdes do Sul de Minas and Caminhos do Sul de Minas tourist circuits.

Future
The planned extension for BR-459 passes through the states of São Paulo and Rio de Janeiro. In São Paulo, the layout of this extension includes a stretch that coincides with the BR-116 in the municipalities of Lorena and Guaratinguetá and the entire SP-171 highway, passing through Cunha. In the state of Rio de Janeiro, the extension coincides with the RJ-165, in Paraty, and with a stretch of the BR-101 to Angra dos Reis, thus incorporating approximately 212 kilometers between the municipalities of Lorena and Angra dos Reis.

References

External links

Federal highways in Brazil
Transport in Minas Gerais
Transport in São Paulo (state)